Nemesis is a Greek mythological spirit of divine retribution against those who succumb to hubris. Nemesis may also refer to:

Outer space
 
 Nemesis (hypothetical star), a proposed dwarf star or brown dwarf in Sun's extreme outer orbit
 128 Nemesis, an asteroid of the main belt

Art, entertainment, and media

Fictional entities
Characters
 Holocaust (Marvel Comics), comic book character also known as Nemesis
 Nemesis (Alpha Flight), comic book characters affiliated with Alpha Flight
 Nemesis (DC Comics), comic book character
 Nemesis (Resident Evil), a.k.a. the Pursuer, a fictional character in Resident Evil universe
 Nemesis (Ultraverse), a Malibu Comics and Marvel Comics character
 Nemesis,  a recurring character in the television series Hercules: The Legendary Journeys
 Nemesis, the leader of the Terrakors in the cartoon Robotix 
 Nemesis, a character in the cartoon The Smurfs
 Nemesis, a god and the main antagonist from the game Black & White
 Nemesis, an arch-enemy in Catacomb Fantasy Trilogy
 Nemesis, a monster in the 2008 home video game Dark Sector by Digital Extremes
 Nemesis, character in Adventures into the Unknown stories
 Nemesis, comic book character in Wildcats (comics)
 Nemesis, character created by author Jeremy Robinson
 Nemesis, one of the main antagonists from the video game Fire Emblem: Three Houses

Others
 Nemesis, a fictional planet in the Sailor Moon Japanese adventure series
 Nemesis, an elite German squadron in Secret Weapons Over Normandy
 Nemesis, the UN organisation The Champions worked for in the 1960s British television spy drama
 Nemesis, a transformation weapon in To Love-Ru Darkness
 Nemesis, a space ship in H. Beam Piper's 1963 novel Space Viking
 Nemesis (Icon Comics), a comic book series from Marvel's Icon imprint written by Mark Millar, with art by Steve McNiven
 Nemesis the Warlock, a comic series by Pat Mills and Kevin O'Neill

Film 
 Nemesis (1920 film), Italian silent film
 Nemesis (1992 film), American science fiction film
 Nemesis (2010 film), German film
 Nemesis (2020 film), Swiss documentary
 Nemesis (2021 film), British thriller
 Star Trek: Nemesis (2002), the 10th Star Trek movie

Games
 Nemesis (draughts player), a checkers engine
 Gradius (video game), a 1985 arcade game known outside Japan as Nemesis
 Nemesis (Game Boy), a 1990 Game Boy game, part of the Gradius series
 Nemesis, a story arc and 2000 expansion set of the fantasy collectible card game, Magic: The Gathering
 Resident Evil 3: Nemesis, a 1999 video game by Capcom
 Zork Nemesis, a 1996 PC based adventure game
 Nemesis, a villain faction or one of the aliases of its leader, Gerhardt Eisenstadt, in the MMORPG, City of Heroes and its sequels, expansions and various revivals.
 Nemesis (board game), a 2018 board game by Awakened Realms

Literature
 Nemesis (Angel novel), a 2004 novel based on the Angel series
 Nemesis (Asimov novel), a 1989 science fiction novel by Isaac Asimov
 Nemesis (Christie novel), a 1971 detective novel by Agatha Christie
 Nemesis (Davis novel), a 2010 historical crime novel by Lindsey Davis
 Nemesis (Momen play), a 1944 play by Nurul Momen
 Nemesis (Nesbø novel), a 2002 crime novel in the Harry Hole series
 Nemesis (Nobel play), an 1896 play by Alfred Nobel
 Nemesis (Roth novel), a 2010 dramatic novel by Philip Roth
 "Exile of the Eons", a 1950 Arthur C. Clarke science fiction short story, later called "Nemesis"
 Nemesis Saga (Robinson novels), since 2012 a series of novels and graphic novels by Jeremy Robinson
 Nemesis, a 1989 fantasy novel in the Indigo series by Louise Cooper
 Nemesis, a 2004 fantasy series by Wolfgang Hohlbein
 Nemesis, a 1989 horror novel by Shaun Hutson
 "Nemesis'", a poem by H. P. Lovecraft in Collected Poems
 Nemesis, a 1998 science fiction thriller by Bill Napier
 Nemesis, by James Swallow, Book 13 in the Horus Heresy book series
 Nemesis, a 2000 Magic: The Gathering novel by Paul B. Thompson

Music

Groups and labels
 Nemesis (Bangladeshi band), a Bangladeshi alternative rock band
 Nemesis (duo), a pop music duo made up of twin brothers Jacob and Joshua Miller
 Nemesis (electronic music band), a Finnish music group
 Nemesis (rap crew), a rap crew from Dallas, Texas
 Nemesis (South Korean band), a South Korean rock band

Albums and EPs
 Nemesis (Grip Inc. album)
 Nemesis (Stratovarius album), 2013
 Nemesis (Two Steps from Hell album), 2007
 Nemesis (EP), 2016 EP by Bridgit Mendler
 Nemesis, 2014 album from Jayce Lewis Protafield
 Nemesis, 2012 album from Azaghal

Songs
 "Nemesis", a song by Arch Enemy on the album Doomsday Machine
 "Nemesis", a song by Benjamin Clementine on the album, At Least for Now
 "Nemesis", a song by Cradle of Filth on the album Nymphetamine
 "Nemesis", a song by Earth Crisis on the album Slither
 "Nemesis", a song by Fossils on the album Fossils
 "Nemesis", a song by David Gray on the album Draw the Line
 "Nemesis", a song by Aaron Parks on the album Invisible Cinema
 "Nemesis", a song by Shriekback on the album Oil & Gold
 "Nemesis", a song by VNV Nation on the album Judgement

Television
 Nemesis (Japanese TV series), a 2020 Japanese drama starring Sho Sakurai 
 Nemesis (TV series), a British-American TV spy drama from BBC and Cinemax
 "Nemesis" (Star Trek: Voyager), episode 4 of season 4 of the 1995 science fiction series
 "Nemesis" (Stargate SG-1), episode 22 of season 3 of the 1997 science fiction series

Defense and military
 Operation Nemesis, a 1920s Armenian military operation
 AN/AAQ-24 Nemesis, a directed infrared countermeasure system for aircraft defense

Ships
 Nemesis (1839), a British warship of the East India Company, used in the First Opium War
 HMS Nemesis, the name of several Royal Navy ships
 OPV Nemesis, a 2008 offshore patrol vessel of the New South Wales Police Force
 USS Nemesis (1869), a U.S. Navy ship

Transport
 Bowler Nemesis, an off-road racing vehicle
 Sharp Nemesis, a racing aircraft
 Nemesis (car), a Lotus Exige modified by British company Ecotricity

Other uses
 Nemesis or archnemesis, an archenemy
 Nemesis (operating system), a discontinued graphical operating system
 Nemesis (philosophy), a classification of emotion in Aristotle's Nicomachean Ethics
 Nemesis (roller coaster), a roller coaster at Alton Towers, England
 Nemesis Inferno, its sister roller coaster at Thorpe Park
 Siderone nemesis, a butterfly in the genus Siderone
 Saint Nemesis (died 250), Egyptian martyr in Alexandria, Egypt

See also
  
 
 Nemesis 2 (disambiguation)
 Nemesius
 Nemausus